Derelicts of Dialect is the second and final studio album by New York hip hop trio 3rd Bass. It was released on June 14, 1991 through Def Jam Recordings. Recording sessions took place at Chung King Studios, Greene St. Recording and Calliope Studios in New York City from October 1990 to May 1991. The production was handled mostly by 3rd Bass themselves, along with Prince Paul, Sam Sever of Downtown Science, John Gamble, Dante Ross and Geeby Dajani of Stimulated Dummies, and KMD. It features guest appearances from Chubb Rock, KMD, Nice & Smooth.

The album is considered to be a critical success (explicitly not aimed toward a mainstream market), and gained publicity by featuring the surprise mainstream hit "Pop Goes the Weasel", a diss track towards Vanilla Ice. The music video features former Black Flag frontman Henry Rollins as Ice. X Clan is dissed on songs such as "Herbalz in Your Mouth".

The album is noted for its variety of styles (both musically and lyrically), and demonstrates influences ranging from De La Soul to A Tribe Called Quest (both members of the then-flourishing Native Tongues movement). Several amusing anecdotes and skits on the album are influenced by 3 Feet High and Rising.

Derelicts of Dialect peaked at number 19 in the United States, at number 46 in the UK, and was certified gold by the Recording Industry Association of America on September 17, 1991.

Track listing

Personnel
Michael Berrin – vocals, producer, percussion
Peter Nash – vocals, producer, accordion
Richard Lawson – scratches, producer
KMD – featured artist & producer (track 3)
Richard Simpson – featured artist (track 19)
Greg Mays – featured artist (track 16)
Darryl Barnes – featured artist (track 16)
John Gamble – producer, engineering, remixing
Dante Ross – producer, remixing
John Dajani – producer, remixing
Paul Huston – producer, cymbals
Sam Citrin – producer, percussion
Christopher Shaw – engineering, keyboards
Allen Title – saxophone, horns
Kevin Reynolds – engineering
Mike Teelucksingh – engineering
Howie Weinberg – mastering
Michael Lavine – photography
Faith Newman – A&R

Charts

Weekly charts

Year-end charts

Certifications

References

External links

1991 albums
3rd Bass albums
Def Jam Recordings albums
Albums produced by Dante Ross
Albums produced by John Gamble (record producer)
Albums produced by Prince Paul (producer)
Albums recorded at Chung King Studios
Albums recorded at Greene St. Recording